Thomas Bancroft may refer to:
Thomas Bancroft (poet) ( 1596–1658), English poet.
Thomas Bancroft (MP) (died 1636), English MP for Castle Rising
Thomas Bancroft (priest) (1756–1811), English Anglican vicar of Bolton-le-Moors
Thomas Lane Bancroft (1860–1933), Australian medical naturalist
Tom Bancroft (born 1967), British jazz drummer and composer